Opie and Anthony's Traveling Virus was a stand-up comedy tour hosted by American radio personalities Gregg "Opie" Hughes and Anthony Cumia that featured a roster of comedians from their radio show, Opie and Anthony. There were three editions of the tour between 2006 and 2008; the first consisted of 4 dates, the second had 8 dates, and the third consisted of a single show.

History
By 2006, Hughes and Cumia, plus comedian Jim Norton on third mic, had been hosting Opie and Anthony on the uncensored subscription-based satellite radio service XM for over a year, from New York City. In April 2006, following the cancellation of The David Lee Roth Show, the pair signed a deal with CBS Radio to simulcast the first half of the show on several of its terrestrial radio stations. Their deal with CBS allowed them to receive the green-light for the tour, ideas for which took shape in the following weeks and artist representative Peter Pappalardo was hired as the tour's organiser. Hughes and Cumia originally envisaged a package comedy tour with several comedians that were regular guests on the radio show, plus theatrical elements. Pappalardo tried to incorporate as many suggestions that the hosts and local promoters had come up with, and sold the tour as "an anything goes type of atmosphere" while adhering to local laws. Each stop on the tour featured the O&A Village, a series of exhibits and attractions including women giving back rubs while dressed in nurse outfits, booths designed by fans of the show, and a "petting zoo" featuring show regulars such as Twitchels and Stalker Patty. The Boston Globe described the tour as "a moving festival more comparable to Lollapalooza or Ozzfest than a typical stand-up event."

Tours

2006

The first ran for four dates in August and September 2006, and was billed as The Comedy Event of 2006. The second date, held on August 26 at the PNC Bank Arts Center in Holmdel, New Jersey, broke the record for the best selling comedy show at the venue previously held by Jay Leno. The tour is noted for the show in Philadelphia, where Bill Burr went on a 12-minute tirade attacking the audience after the previous comedian, Dom Irrera, was heckled heavily by the crowd. Video of the rant was filmed by an audience member and was subsequently posted on various platforms, including YouTube. The video was a bonus feature on Burr's comedy special Why Do I Do This?, released on DVD in 2008.

2007
The 2007 tour kicked off with one show in Las Vegas, Nevada on April 14. An additional seven shows were announced for the summer, which started on June 16, one day following the show's month-long suspension from XM Satellite Radio for the Homeless Charlie incident. Burr turned down an invitation to perform on the 2007 tour due to the relentless booing, saying "I earned my Purple Heart" on the last one.

2008
In 2008, plans to stage a full tour were cancelled in favor of a single show at the PNC Bank Arts Center in Holmdel, New Jersey, on August 2, 2008. Two days later, Hughes and Cumia announced on the air that the tour would no longer continue, due to the booing that newcomer Mike Birbiglia received when he appeared on stage. Hughes revealed that Dave Attell and Jimmy Fallon turned down an offer to perform due to the hostile crowds.

Tour dates and line-ups

Dates
Show 1 — August 5, 2006 — Worcester, Massachusetts – DCU Center
Show 2 — August 26, 2006 — Holmdel, New Jersey – PNC Bank Arts Center
Show 3 — September 9, 2006 — Camden, New Jersey – Tweeter Center
Show 4 — September 23, 2006 — Cleveland, Ohio – Tower City Amphitheatre
Show 5 — April 14, 2007 — Las Vegas, Nevada – The Joint at Hard Rock Hotel and Casino
Show 6 — June 16, 2007 — Wantagh, New York – Jones Beach Amphitheater
Show 7 — June 30, 2007 — Uncasville, Connecticut – Mohegan Sun Arena
Show 8 — July 21, 2007 — Mansfield, Massachusetts – Tweeter Center
Show 9 — August 4, 2007 — Detroit, Michigan – DTE Energy Music Theatre
Show 10 — August 18, 2007 — Bristow, Virginia – Nissan Pavilion
Show 11 — August 25, 2007 — Holmdel, New Jersey – PNC Bank Arts Center
Show 12 — September 15, 2007 — Camden, New Jersey – Tweeter Center
Show 13 — August 2, 2008 — Holmdel, New Jersey – PNC Bank Arts Center

Line-up

References

Comedy tours